Stanley Robinson (1911–1995) was an Australian rugby league player who played in the 1930s.

Playing career
A talented full-back, Robinson played seven seasons with St. George between 1931-1937, and played in the 1933 Grand Final losing to Newtown 18-5. 

He also represented New South Wales City Firsts on two occasions in 1933 and 1935.

In 1935, Robinson played in the historic blowout winning 91-6 against Canterbury at Earl Park, Arncliffe.  As of the 2019 NRL season, this remains the biggest recorded victory by a team and the biggest winning margin.

Death
Robinson died on 28 April 1995, aged 83.

Career stats

Club

Representative

References

St. George Dragons players
Australian rugby league players
City New South Wales rugby league team players
1911 births
1995 deaths
Rugby league fullbacks